Jacqueline Reem Salloum is a Palestinian/Syrian American artist and filmmaker. She received her MFA from New York University. Her work has been featured at Sundance Film Festival. She is the director and editor of the award-winning film, Slingshot Hip Hop, the first feature-length documentary about the Palestinian Hip Hop scene which premiered at the Sundance Film Festival. Salloum directed and edited Planet of the Arabs, an experimental short on Hollywood’s negative depiction of Arabs and Muslims through the decades. Inspired by Dr. Jack Shaheen’s book, Reel Bad Arabs, the award winning short film was an official selection at the Sundance Film Festival and has also been exhibited in art galleries and museums globally and used in classrooms as an educational tool on stereotypes in the media. In 2017 Salloum was an Artist in Residence at New York University and taught the class, Memory Metamorphosis. Salloum’s art and video work have been exhibited in the US and internationally including, Mori Art Museum, Japan; Reina Sofia, Spain; Museum of Contemporary Art Taipei, Taiwan; Institute of Contemporary Arts, London; Palazzo delle Papesse Centre for Contemporary Art, Sienna, Italy, Wallspace Gallery, New York and Void Gallery, Ireland as well as film festivals; IDFA, New Directors New Films, Tiff kids, DoxBox Syria and Beirut International Film Festival.

External links
 Jacqueline Reem Salloum
 
 Jackie Salloum at "Dreams of a nation", Columbia University.

Living people
American people of Palestinian descent
Palestinian film directors
Palestinian women film directors
American film directors
American women film directors
Syrian artists
Palestinian women artists
Syrian women artists
Palestinian contemporary artists
Year of birth missing (living people)
21st-century American women